Sotragero is a municipality and town located in the province of Burgos, Castile and León, Spain. According to the 2007 census (INE), the municipality has a population of 230 inhabitants. 
Sotragero is 8 km north from Burgos, and it is a member of the Alfoz de Burgos in the valley of the Ubierna river.

References

Municipalities in the Province of Burgos